In the temporal bone, between the posterior wall of the external acoustic meatus and the posterior root of the zygomatic process is the area called the suprameatal triangle, suprameatal pit, mastoid fossa, foveola suprameatica, or Mc Ewan's triangle, through which an instrument may be pushed into the mastoid antrum.
In the adult, the antrum lies approximately 1.5 to 2 cm deep to the suprameatal triangle.  This is an important landmark when performing a cortical mastoidectomy.
The triangle lies deep to the cymba conchae.

References 

Bones of the head and neck